Saint-Eugène-d'Argentenay is a municipality in the Canadian province of Quebec, located within the regional county municipality of Maria-Chapdelaine. The municipality had a population of 488 as of the Canada 2016 Census. Prior to 1997 it was known simply as Saint-Eugène.

Demographics
Population trend:
 Population in 2016: 488 (2011 to 2016 population change: -10.6%)
 Population in 2011: 546 (2006 to 2011 population change: -4.5%)
 Population in 2006: 572
 Population in 2001: 608
 Population in 1996: 651
 Population in 1991: 692

Private dwellings occupied by usual residents: 204 (total dwellings: 217)

Mother tongue:
 English as first language: 1%
 French as first language: 99%
 English and French as first language: 0%
 Other as first language: 0%

References

Municipalities in Quebec
Incorporated places in Saguenay–Lac-Saint-Jean
Maria-Chapdelaine Regional County Municipality